The Girls Get Even is a children's novel by Phyllis Reynolds Naylor published by Random House, originally in 1993. It is part of the Boys Against Girls series. It is also issued in a double format with The Boys Start the War. The book is set in the fictional town of Buckman, West Virginia, which is based on the actual town of Buckhannon.

Plot
The girls plan to play a dirty trick on the boys. When the boys find out, both side make a deal, that who ever makes the best Halloween costume will get to boss the other team around for a whole month. At the Halloween carnival the boys sabotage the girls' costume and the girls sabotage the boys’ costume. The boys are so upset they plan a trick on the girls; they make a fake party invitation saying go to the cemetery and follow the clues they see, and at the end of the clues the boys would pour worms and pasta all over them. But the girls tricked the boys by emptying the bucket of worms and pasta. The boys missed their chance of getting candy, when they got home the girls were waiting and ready for a party.

References

2002 American novels
American children's novels

Novels set in West Virginia
Upshur County, West Virginia
2002 children's books